is a Japanese manga series written by Tatsuhiko Yamagami and illustrated by Mikio Igarashi. Published by Kodansha, it was serialized in the seinen manga magazine Evening from June 2011 to April 2014, with its chapters compiled into five tankōbon volumes. A live-action film adaptation directed by Daihachi Yoshida was released in Japan in February 2018.

Media

Manga
Hitsuji no Ki is written by Tatsuhiko Yamagami and illustrated by Mikio Igarashi. It was serialized in Kodansha's Evening from June 14, 2011 to April 8, 2014. Kodansha collected its chapters in five tankōbon volumes, released from November 22, 2011 to May 23, 2014.

Volumes

Live-action film
A live-action film adaptation of the manga titled The Scythian Lamb was released on February 3, 2018. The film is directed by Daihachi Yoshida and had its premiere at the 2017 Busan Film Festival.

Reception
The manga was one of the Jury Selections in the Manga Division of the 16th Japan Media Arts Festival Awards in 2012. It was nominated for the 17th Annual Tezuka Osamu Cultural Prize in 2013. It was also nominated for the 18th Annual Tezuka Osamu Cultural Prize in 2014, and also for the Reader Award at the same awards. It won an Excellence Award in the Manga Division of the 18th Japan Media Arts Festival Awards in 2014.

References

External links
 
 

2014 comics endings
Kodansha manga
Live-action films based on manga
Manga adapted into films
Seinen manga
Suspense anime and manga
Japanese thriller films